Paul D. Rosenthal (born February 29, 1959) is a Minnesota politician and former member of the Minnesota House of Representatives. A member of the Minnesota Democratic–Farmer–Labor Party (DFL), he represented District 49B, which included west Bloomington, south Edina, northeast Eden Prairie, and southwest Minnetonka in Hennepin County in the Twin Cities metropolitan area.

Early life, education, and career
Rosenthal attended New York University in New York City, earning his B.A. in metropolitan studies and urban planning. He was an international currency trader by profession, and was also a partner in ADRZ, a nonprofit development group that works to save endangered historic buildings.

Minnesota House of Representatives
Rosenthal was first elected in 2008. He was unseated by Republican Pat Mazorol in the 2010 general election. In 2012, he won his seat back against Terry Jacobson. He announced in June 2018 that he had accepted a job as director of external affairs for Western Governors University in the state of Utah and would not seek reelection. He resigned effective on September 5, 2018.

Personal life
Rosenthal is Jewish. He is married to Elizabeth McCall. They have two children.

References

External links

 Project Votesmart - Rep. Paul Rosenthal Profile
 Session Weekly article on Rep. Rosenthal

1960 births
Living people
People from Edina, Minnesota
Jewish American state legislators in Minnesota
Democratic Party members of the Minnesota House of Representatives
Jewish American politicians
21st-century American politicians
Western Governors University people
New York University alumni
21st-century American Jews